Meldrum is a surname, and may refer to:

 Andrew Meldrum (born 1951), American reporter
 Andrew Norman Meldrum (1876–1934), Scottish scientist
 Charles Meldrum (1821–1901), Scottish meteorologist
 Colin Meldrum (born 1975), Scottish footballer
 Courtney Meldrum (born 1977), American long-distance runner
 Fiona Meldrum, British chemistry professor
 Glenn Meldrum (born 1986), Australian actor
 Ian Meldrum or Molly Meldrum (born 1943), Australian media personality
 Jeffrey Meldrum (born 1958), American anthropologist
 Sir John Meldrum (died 1645), Scottish soldier
 John W. Meldrum (died 1936), 1st U.S. Commissioner, Yellowstone National Park
 Keith Meldrum (20th century), British veterinarian
 Max Meldrum (1875–1955), Australian painter
 Michael Meldrum (born 1968), Canadian swimmer
 Michelle Meldrum (1968–2008), American guitarist
 Norman H. Meldrum (19th century), American politician
 Paul Meldrum (born 1960), Australian rules footballer
 Wendel Meldrum (born 1958), Canadian actress
 William Meldrum (general) (1865–1964), New Zealand WWI general 

Scottish surnames